The 79th Group Army, formerly the 39th Group Army, is a military formation of the Chinese People's Liberation Army Ground Forces (PLAGF). The 79th Group Army is one of twelve total group armies of the PLAGF, the largest echelon of ground forces in the People's Republic of China, and one of three assigned to the nation's Northern Theater Command.

History 
The army was a military formation of the People's Volunteer Army (People's Volunteer Army (PVA) or Chinese Communist Forces (CCF)) during the Korean War. It comprised the 115th, 116th, and 117th Divisions.

In April 1953, the corps returned from North Korea and redeployed at Liaoyang, Liaoning Province.

In April 1960, the corps was redesignated as the 39th Army Corps(). Since then the structure of the corps was:
Corps Headquarters
115th Army Division
343rd Regiment
344th Regiment
345th Regiment
395th Artillery Regiment
320th Tank Self-Propelled Artillery Regiment
116th Army Division
346th Regiment
347th Regiment
348th Regiment
396th Artillery Regiment
321st Tank Self-Propelled Artillery Regiment
117th Army Division
349th Regiment
350th Regiment
351st Regiment
397th Artillery Regiment
322nd Tank Self-Propelled Artillery Regiment
144th Artillery Regiment
64th Anti-Aircraft Artillery Regiment

In 1969, the numbers in designations of the artillery and anti-aircraft artillery regiments were dropped. 

In February 1976, the Tank Regiment of 39th Army Corps was activated from the 11th Tank Regiment, 3rd Tank Division.

Organization 
By 1976 the army corps was composed of:
Corps Headquarters
115th Army Division
343rd Regiment
344th Regiment
345th Regiment
Artillery Regiment
116th Army Division
346th Regiment
347th Regiment
348th Regiment
Artillery Regiment
117th Army Division
349th Regiment
350th Regiment
351st Regiment
Artillery Regiment
Tank Regiment
Artillery Regiment
Anti-Aircraft Artillery Regiment

In 1983, the 3rd Tank Division and the 7th Artillery Division were put under 39th Army Corps' control.

In May 1984, Tank Regiment, 39th Army Corps was attached to the 116th Army Division following the latter's reconstruction into a mechanized army division.

In September 1985, the 39th Army Corps was reconstituted as the 39th Army(). The army was then composed of:
Army Headquarters
115th Infantry Division - a northern motorized infantry division, category A
343rd Infantry Regiment
344th Infantry Regiment
345th Infantry Regiment
Tank Regiment
Artillery Regiment
Anti-Aircraft Artillery Regiment
116th Infantry Division - a mechanized infantry division
346th Mechanized Infantry Regiment
347th Mechanized Infantry Regiment
348th Mechanized Infantry Regiment
Tank Regiment
Artillery Regiment
Anti-Aircraft Artillery Regiment
117th Infantry Division - a northern motorized infantry division, category B
349th Infantry Regiment
350th Infantry Regiment
351st Infantry Regiment
Tank Regiment
Artillery Regiment
Anti-Aircraft Artillery Regiment
3rd Tank Division - a combined arms army tank division
9th Tank Regiment
10th Tank Regiment
12th Tank Regiment
Mechanized Infantry Regiment
Artillery Regiment
Antiaircraft Artillery Regiment
Artillery Brigade
Anti-Aircraft Artillery Brigade
Engineer Regiment
Communications Regiment

In May-June 1989, the army participated in the crackdown on protest and riots in urban Beijing area.

In 1996, the 117th Infantry Division detached from the army to become a People's Armed Police unit. Tank Regiment, 114th Infantry Division was put under direct control by the army until 1998, when it was disbanded. In 1998, 190th Infantry Division joined the army as the 190th Mechanized Infantry Brigade.

As of 2010, the army was composed of:
Army Headquarters
115th Infantry Division
343rd Infantry Regiment
345th Infantry Regiment
Armored Regiment
Artillery Regiment
Anti-Aircraft Artillery Regiment
116th Infantry Division
346th Mechanized Infantry Regiment
347th Mechanized Infantry Regiment
Armored Regiment
Artillery Regiment
Anti-Aircraft Artillery Regiment
3rd Armored Division
9th Armored Regiment
10th Armored Regiment
12th Armored Regiment
Artillery Regiment
Antiaircraft Artillery Regiment
190th Mechanized Infantry Brigade
Artillery Brigade
Anti-Aircraft Brigade
Army Aviation Brigade
6th Engineer Regiment
Communications Regiment
NBC Defense Regiment
EW Regiment

As of 2016, the army was composed of:
Army Headquarters
115th Infantry Brigade
116th Infantry Division
346th Mechanized Infantry Regiment
347th Mechanized Infantry Regiment
Armored Regiment
Artillery Regiment
Anti-Aircraft Regiment
3rd Armored Brigade
190th Mechanized Infantry Brigade
202nd Mechanized Infantry Brigade
203rd Motorized Infantry Brigade
Artillery Brigade
Anti-Aircraft Brigade
Army Aviation Brigade
6th Engineer Regiment
Communications Regiment
NBC Defense Regiment
EW Regiment

In April 2017, the army was reconfigured as the 79th Army.

References 

Field armies of the People's Volunteer Army
Field armies of the People's Liberation Army
Northern Theater Command
Shenyang Military Region